The Cavalcade of Scaër (or The Cavalcade) is a carnival festival that takes place in the town of Scaër, a commune in the Finistère department of Brittany in northwestern France. Every odd year since 1923, during the Pentecost weekend (Sunday and Monday), about 5,000 inhabitants of Scaër welcome about 50,000 spectators for The Cavalcade carnival, which the town owes its nickname  ("Scaër the Merry").

See also
 Cavalcade
 Float (parade)
 Parade

References

External links
  (in French)

Carnivals in France
Festivals in France
French culture
French folklore
Recurring events established in 1923
Tourist attractions in Finistère
Festivals established in 1923
Spring (season) events in France